The Magnetic Hill Zoo (formerly the Magnetic Hill Game Farm) is a  zoo located adjacent to Magnetic Hill and the Magic Mountain in the Magnetic Hill Area of Moncton, New Brunswick. The zoo has over 400 animals, making it the largest zoo in Atlantic Canada. In 2008, the zoo was rated fourth on a list of Canada's top ten zoos.

The zoo has been accredited member of the Canadian Association of Zoos and Aquariums (CAZA) since 1993.

History

The Magnetic Hill Zoo began as the Magnetic Hill Game Farm in 1953. Originally, the game farm was home to orphaned and injured indigenous species like owls, bears, and deer. The city of Moncton took over the park in 1979 and began acquiring more exotic species which served as a catalyst for the renaming the farm to Magnetic Hill Zoo.

In 1995, the zoo began a  expansion called the African Oasis. At the same time, the zoo also expanded by adding the Primate Conservation Centre, frog bog, the koi pond, bird garden, the Camel-Zebra exhibit, and a children's playground.

In 1997–98, the Insectarium exhibit, a new entrance building, and new food facilities were built.  The bears were moved to a new exhibit, which permitted them to live in a natural habitat for the first time. The zoo's education programs received an Achievement Award from the Canadian Association of Zoos and Aquariums.

A new reptile house exhibit, known as the Ecodome, was opened in 2003. The Ecodome was built on the site of the former bear "pit".  The Ecodome was awarded the Environmental Enrichment Award by CAZA. Exhibits for the barbary sheep and bison were also completed.

A new expanded Education Centre with three classrooms, washrooms, an office, kitchen, first aid room, and Discovery Centre were added in 2003.

Between 2003 and 2004 exhibits were expanded or refurbished, including habitats for the otters, wolves, watusi, and eland. A deer contact area was constructed.

In 2005, construction began on the Pridelands exhibit, a habitat for lions and ostrich. The exhibit's grand opening was held in July 2006 and won the Canadian Association of Zoos and Aquariums Environmental Enrichment Award for the exhibit. A new food concession stand was also renovated in 2005 and the zoo was awarded the New-Brunswick Top Attraction Status.

In 2006, significant upgrades were made to the walking path system and signage in order to make the zoo more accessible to the public.

In 2008, a new Cougar Country Exhibit was built which was awarded the zoos third CAZA Environmental Enrichment Award.

In 2009, a new Jaguar Exhibit was built to resemble the Cougar Country Exhibit built the previous year. The zoo's animal collection was expanded to include mandrills, a colobus monkey, and two African lion cubs. Because of the continued successful breeding program of the zoo's black and white ruffed lemurs, the construction of a new enclosure for these monkeys was started.  The former Insectarium exhibit was renovated and reopened as The Container.

Friends of the Zoo

The zoo is supported heavily by a fund-raising organization, Friends of the Zoo, which was founded in 1989 by Shirley Dingley, Deborah Fisher, Bruce Dougan, and Carolyn Dunlop. Friends of the Zoo focus primarily on raising funds to improve animal habitats at the zoo. 

In 2022, the park unveiled the "wild lights" attraction. The Magnetic Hill Zoo displays hundreds of thousands of holiday lights throughout its 40-acre park. The park chooses different species to highlight each year. The attraction is usually open during the holiday season and closed on December 24 and December 25. 

The "Boo at the Zoo" attraction is an event held mid-October leading to Halloween. The park hosts a family-friendly Halloween themed zoo experience featuring decorations and mild, moderate to scary Halloween venues. Children are encouraged to wear their Halloween costumes to venture around the Zoo.

Animals

Magnetic Hill Zoo has more than 400 animals, including over 100 indigenous and exotic species or birds, mammals, insects, reptiles and fish. Animals housed at the zoo include:

 African lion (Panthera leo)
 Ankole cattle (Watusi) (Bos taurus)
 Arctic wolf (Canis lupus arctos)
 Bald eagle
 Barbary sheep (Ammotragus lervia)
 Barn owl (Tyto alba)
 Black bear (Ursus americanus)
 Black vulture (Coragyps atratus)
 Black and white ruffed lemur (Varecia variegata)
 Blue and gold macaw (Ara ararauna)
 Burchelli's zebra (Equus burchelli)
 Channel-billed toucan (Ramphastos vitellinus)
 Coatimundi (Nasua narica)
 Crow (Corvus brachyrhynchos)
 East African crowned crane (Balearica regulorum)
 Eland (Tragelaphus oryx)
 European fallow deer (Dama dama)
 Fantail pigeon (Columba livia domestica)
 Great horned owl (Bubo virginianus)
 Guinea pig (Cavia porcellus)
 Indian blue peafowl (Pavo cristatus)
 Jaguar (Panthera onca)
 Kookaburra (Dacelo novaeguineae)
 Lesser sulphur-crested cockatoo (Cacatua sulphurea)
 Marabou stork (Leptoptilos crumenifer)
 Przewalski's horse (Equus ferus przewalskii)

 Pygmy goat (Capra hircus)
 Pony (Equus caballus)
 Raccoon (Procyon lotor)
 Red-eared slider turtle (Trachemys scripta elegans)
 Red-golden pheasant (Chrysolophus pictus)
 Reeves's muntjac (Muntiacus reevesi)
 Rhea (Rhea americana)
 Ring tailed lemur (Lemur catta)
 River otter (Lontra canadensis)
 Ringed neck dove (Streptopelia risoria)
 Scarlet macaw (Ara macao)
 Siberian tiger
 Sicilian donkey (Equus asinus)
 Sika deer (Cervus nippon)
 Silky chicken (Gallus domesticus)
 Sulphur-crested cockatoo (Cacatua sulphurea)
 White-handed gibbon (Hylobates lar)
 White-tailed deer (Odocoileus virginianus)
 Wood bison (Bison bison athabascae)

See also
List of zoos in Canada
List of aquaria in Canada

References

External links

Tourist attractions in Moncton
Zoos in New Brunswick
Buildings and structures in Moncton
1953 establishments in New Brunswick
Zoos established in 1953